Dr. Franz Anton Basch (13 July 1901 – 27 April 1946) was a Shwovish Nazi politician, the chairman of Volksbund der Deutschen in Ungarn and the leader of the Shwoveh (Danube Swabian) community in Hungary.

Franz Basch was born in Zürich in 1901. He was a student of the more moderate nationalist activist Jakob Bleyer and earned his doctorate at the University of Budapest between 1920 and 1924. He matriculated from the University of Munich on 5 December 1925 In 1925 he became the secretary of the German Cultural Society. He published many works in this period.

From 1930, he began to express extreme nationalist propaganda and became a follower of Nazism. In 1934 he resigned his position because he affronted the Hungarian nation with his ideas. In 1938 he founded the Racial Union Of Germans In Hungary (the Volksbund or VDU) and became its chairman, organizing it along Nazi lines with the financial backing of the Third Reich. In 1939, Basch took the title Volksgruppenführer (Racial Group Leader) of the ethnic Germans in Hungary. In 1940 Hitler appointed him the leader of Germans in Hungary (the Danube Swabians and the Transylvanian Saxons).  In the first two enlistment periods of ethnic Germans in Hungary in 1942 and 1943, Franz Basch, as head of the VDU, actively participated and was responsible for enlisting over 40,000 Hungarian citizens in the Waffen-SS for Nazi Germany.

At the end of 1944, he escaped to Germany but was ended up in Hungary in 1945. He was tried and sentenced to death for war crimes and executed in Budapest in 1946. A detailed but sympathetic analysis of Basch's trial is available in Seewann and Spannenberger (1999).

See also 
Basch

References

External links 
Magyar Életrajzi Lexikon: Basch Ferenc Antal (In Hungarian)
Lyon, P. W. (2008) AFTER EMPIRE: ETHNIC GERMANS AND MINORITY NATIONALISM IN INTERWAR YUGOSLAVIA. PhD Dissertation.  College Park:UMd.
 

1901 births
1946 deaths
Danube-Swabian people
Executed Hungarian collaborators with Nazi Germany
Hungarian Nazis
Hungarian politicians
Nazi Party politicians
Nazis convicted of war crimes